Dig is an American mystery/action-thriller miniseries that premiered on USA Network on March 5, 2015, and ran until May 7. Created by Gideon Raff and Tim Kring, it stars Jason Isaacs as FBI Agent Peter Connelly and Anne Heche as Lynn Monahan, Peter's boss and occasional lover. When Peter investigates the murder of a young American in Jerusalem, he uncovers an international conspiracy thousands of years in the making. The series also stars Alison Sudol, David Costabile, Regina Taylor, Lauren Ambrose, Angela Bettis, and Ori Pfeffer. On May 12, 2015, USA Network cancelled Dig.

Premise
The story focuses on an FBI agent who is based in Jerusalem and discovers a plot that dates back 2000 years while investigating a murder. The focus is on the prophetic return of the Jewish temple.

Cast
 Jason Isaacs as FBI Special Agent Peter Connelly
 Anne Heche as Special Agent in Charge Lynn Monahan, FBI Legal Attache, plus Peter's boss who uses him for her pleasures
 Ori Pfeffer as Detective Golan Cohen
 Melinda Page Hamilton as Sandra
 Alison Sudol as Emma Wilson
 Regina Taylor as Ambassador Ruth Ridell
 David Costabile as Tad Billingham
 Richard E. Grant as Ian Margrove
 Lauren Ambrose as Debbie Morgan
 Asi Cohen as Shem
 Angela Bettis as Fay

Production
The series is produced by Universal Cable Productions. It began filming in Jerusalem, but then moved production to Dubrovnik, Pula, Split and Trogir, Croatia and later to Albuquerque, New Mexico, due to the 2014 Israel–Gaza conflict. Isaacs stated that when the show was originally written the entire premise was around shooting in Jerusalem.

Episodes
Six episodes of Dig were originally picked up for the miniseries, but this was later upped to ten episodes.

References

External links
 
 

2015 American television series debuts
2015 American television series endings
American action television series
American adventure television series
2010s American drama television series
2010s American medical television series
Television series about cloning
English-language television shows
Mythology in popular culture
Television series by Universal Content Productions
Television series created by Tim Kring
Television series created by Gideon Raff
Television shows filmed in Vancouver
Television shows set in Israel
Television shows set in Los Angeles
USA Network original programming